The Quick and the Dead is a 1995 American revisionist Western film directed by Sam Raimi, and starring Sharon Stone, Gene Hackman, Russell Crowe and Leonardo DiCaprio. The screenplay was written by Simon Moore but includes contributions from Joss Whedon. The story focuses on "The Lady" (Stone), a gunfighter who rides into the frontier town of Redemption, controlled by John Herod (Hackman). The Lady joins a deadly dueling competition in an attempt to exact revenge for her father's death.

Simon Moore's script was purchased by Sony Pictures Entertainment in May 1993, and actress Sharon Stone signed on as both star and co-producer. Development was fast tracked after director Sam Raimi's hiring, and principal photography began in Old Tucson Studios in Arizona on November 21, 1993. The film was distributed by TriStar Pictures and was released in the United States on February 10, 1995, to a dismal box office performance, receiving mixed reviews from critics. In later years, however, the film has earned critical praise especially for the performances, direction, cinematography and musical score, with some critics noting it as underrated in Raimi's catalog.

This was Russell Crowe's American Western film debut and was Woody Strode's final performance (the film is dedicated to him), as well as the last theatrical release of Roberts Blossom who died in 2011. The phrase "the quick and the dead" is from the Second Epistle to Timothy (2 Timothy 4:1) in various Bible versions, including the King James Bible, describing the final judgment. The plot of this film bears no resemblance to that of the 1987 film of the same name, which was based on a western novel by Louis L'Amour.

Plot
In 1881, a gunslinger known as "The Lady" arrives in the Old West town of Redemption, which is ruled by a ruthless outlaw named John Herod. Herod has announced a fast-draw single elimination shooting tournament with the following rules: any contestant may challenge any other, no challenge can be refused, every contestant must fight once per day, and a fight continues until one contestant either yields or dies. The Lady announces her participation, insisting that she is only interested in the large cash prize.

During the sign-up, Herod's henchmen arrive with Cort, a former member of their gang with exceptional gunfighting skill. Cort has renounced violence to become a preacher and refuses to participate in the tournament. Herod's men attempt to lynch him, but The Lady shoots through the rope, freeing him. 

The Lady meets "The Kid", a brash young man who believes Herod is his father and hopes to earn his respect by winning the tournament. She wakes up alone in the Kid's bed, and notices some barrels of loose dynamite under it. In the first round, Herod, The Kid, and The Lady easily defeat their opponents. Herod gives Cort a cheap gun and declares that he can only have one bullet at a time, to prevent him from shooting his way out of town. Despite his conversion, Cort reflexively draws when challenged and wins his first-round duel.

Before the second round, Herod meets with Clay Cantrell, a professional gunfighter hired by the townspeople to kill him. Herod declares that all duels are now to the death and kills Cantrell. The Kid wins his second fight. That evening, The Lady faces off with Eugene Dred after he rapes the saloon owner's young daughter, eventually killing him. Upset, she rides out of town.

The next day, Cort duels a Native American gunslinger, Spotted Horse, and must beg for a second bullet when his first shot fails to kill him. Doc Wallace finds The Lady at a nearby cemetery and tells her that he recognizes her and knows why she is there. Flashbacks reveal that the Lady's real name is Ellen. Her father was the marshal in Redemption until Herod's gang invaded and lynched him. Herod gave Ellen a pistol and three shots to try and shoot the rope, but she accidentally killed him, after which she fled town. Doc hands Ellen her father's old badge and begs her to help rid the town of Herod.

Ellen rides back to town and convinces Cort to help her defeat Herod. Ellen challenges Herod, but he has already accepted a challenge from The Kid. As Ellen and Cort are the only fighters left, Herod orders them to fight, threatening to kill them himself if they refuse. Herod urges The Kid to withdraw, but he refuses. He wounds Herod but ultimately loses the duel. Herod coldly refuses to take his hand while he dies, and afterward says it was never proven that he was the Kid's father.

When Cort and Ellen face off, Cort draws and fires on her, and Doc declares Ellen dead. Cort angrily demands to fight Herod immediately, but settles for dawn of the next day. That night, one of Herod's men breaks Cort's right hand. The next morning, Herod rebukes the henchman and kills him for harming Cort. Herod confesses that he is afraid of Cort, which is why he forced him to enter the tournament. As a matter of honor, he offers to fight Cort left-handed, but still instructs his henchmen to kill Cort if he wins.

At the moment Herod draws, several buildings explode, including Herod's house and the clock tower. Ellen emerges from the smoke and flames, having faked her death and planted The Kid's dynamite with help from Cort and Doc. Cort kills Herod's remaining henchmen while Ellen faces off against Herod, revealing her identity by throwing her father's badge at his feet. Herod wounds Ellen but she shoots him and finishes him off with a bullet to the eye. Tossing the badge to Cort, she says, "The law's come back to town", then saddles up and rides away.

Cast

 Sharon Stone as Ellen "The Lady"
 Stacy Linn Ramsower as Young Ellen
 Gene Hackman as John Herod
 Russell Crowe as Cort
 Leonardo DiCaprio as Fee "The Kid" Herod
 Pat Hingle as Horace, The Bartender
 Kevin Conway as Eugene Dred
 Keith David as Sergeant Clay Cantrell
 Lance Henriksen as "Ace" Hanlon
 Mark Boone Junior as "Scars"
 Tobin Bell as "Dog" Kelly
 Raynor Scheine as Ratsy
 Lennie Loftin as Foy
 Fay Masterson as Mattie Silk
 Olivia Burnette as Katie
 Roberts Blossom as "Doc" Wallace
 Gary Sinise as The Marshal
 Sven-Ole Thorsen as "Swede" Gutzon
 David Cornell as "Simp" Dixon
 Josef Rainer as Virgil Sparks
 Arturo Gastelum as Carlos Montoya
 Scott Spiegel as Gold Teeth Man
 Woody Strode as Charlie Moonlight
 Bruce Campbell as Wedding Shemp
 Jonothon Gill as Spotted Horse
 Jerry Swindall as The Blind Boy

Production

Development
Writer Simon Moore finished his spec script for The Quick and the Dead in late 1992, writing it as a homage to the Spaghetti Westerns of Sergio Leone, particularly the Dollars Trilogy starring Clint Eastwood. The writer decided the lead character should be a female. "When you introduce women into that kind of world, something very interesting happens and you have an interesting dynamic straight away," Moore commented. The names of the lead villain (Herod) and the town (Redemption) were intentional allusions to the Bible. Moore considered directing his own script as an independent film and shooting The Quick and the Dead on a $3–4 million budget in either Spain or Italy.

Sony Pictures Entertainment purchased Moore's script in May 1993 and approached Sharon Stone to star in the lead role in July 1993. Because Stone also signed on as co-producer, she had approval over the choice of director. Sam Raimi was hired to direct because Stone was impressed with his work on Army of Darkness (1992). The actress told the producers that if Raimi did not direct the film, she would not star in it. Although she had mixed emotions on Raimi's previous work, she believed that the director still had yet to showcase his talents, feeling that The Quick and the Dead would be a perfect opportunity to "stretch the limits of his technical and creative ability." Moore was also enthusiastic over Raimi's hiring, based on his previous work with the Evil Dead film series.

When Sony began fast tracking development of The Quick and the Dead, the studio commissioned a series of rewrites from Moore. The writer was eventually dismissed and replaced with John Sayles, who, according to Moore, took Sony's orders of "making more of an American Old West film." Moore was rehired with filming to begin in three weeks because Sayles' script was approaching a 2.5 hour runtime. When rewriting the shooting script, Moore simply omitted Sayles' work without Sony noticing. A week before shooting, Sony considered the script good so that Moore described the rewrites "a completely fucking pointless exercise."

Filming
Russell Crowe originally auditioned for a different role in the film before Sharon Stone asked that the actor try for the lead male role. "When I saw Romper Stomper (1992), I thought Russell was not only charismatic, attractive and talented but also fearless," Stone reasoned. "And I find fearlessness very attractive. I was convinced I wouldn't scare him." Raimi found Crowe to be "bold and challenging. He reminds me of what we imagine the American cowboy to have been like." On working with Raimi, Crowe later described the director as "sort of like the fourth Stooge."

Sony Pictures was dubious over Stone's choice of Crowe because he was not a famous actor in the mid-1990s. To cast Gene Hackman in the role of Herod, TriStar Pictures changed the shooting location from Durango, Mexico to Tucson, Arizona. Matt Damon was offered the role of Fee 'The Kid' Herod but declined. Sam Rockwell auditioned for The Kid, a role which ended up going to Leonardo DiCaprio. Sony was also hesitant about DiCaprio's casting. As a result, Stone paid DiCaprio's salary herself.

Filming was originally set to begin in October 1993, but was delayed because Crowe was busy on another film in Australia. Principal photography for The Quick and the Dead lasted from November 21, 1993, to February 27, 1994. Locations included Old Tucson Studios in Arizona and Mescal, 40 miles southeast of Tucson. Production was briefly halted at times over weather problems. Thell Reed, who was hired as the gun coach and weapons master, worked with the cast through over three months of training. To age Cort's Colt 1851 Navy Revolver and the other guns used, Reed experimented with simple measures. "I took them out by my swimming pool and dipped them in chlorine water to let them rust," he explained. "They looked rusty and old, but were brand new guns." Such detail, including the nickel plating and ivory handles on Ellen's Colt Peacemakers, was accurate to the time period.

The town of Redemption was designed by Patrizia von Brandenstein, known for her work on Amadeus (1984) and The Untouchables (1987). Raimi's first choice as the visual effects supervisor was William Mesa, his collaborator on Darkman (1990) and Army of Darkness (1992). Instead, Sony chose The Computer Film Company to create the VFX sequences. Pick-up scenes took place through November - December 1994. This included an extended duel between Sharon Stone and Gene Hackman.

Stone had a love scene with Crowe removed from the final cut of The Quick and the Dead before the film's release in the United States. The actress/co-producer thought the scene did not fit in with the picture's established reality. It was restored for the home cinema releases of the film.

Soundtrack
The original motion picture soundtrack for The Quick and the Dead, was released by the Varèse Sarabande music label on February 14, 1995. The score for the film was composed and conducted by Alan Silvestri and mixed by Dennis Sands. Kenneth Karman and Thomas Drescher edited the film's music.

Release

Box office
The Quick and the Dead was released in the U.S. and Canada on February 10, 1995, in 2,158 theaters, earning $6,515,861 in its opening weekend, placing second at the US box office behind Billy Madison by $124,000. The film eventually grossed $18,636,537 at the US and Canadian box office. Writer Simon Moore noted that the film performed modestly in Europe. The movie grossed
$28 million outside the United States and Canada, for a worldwide gross of $47 million.

Director Sam Raimi later blamed himself and his visual style for the film's failure. "I was very confused after I made that movie. For a number of years I thought, I'm like a dinosaur. I couldn't change with the material." TriStar Pictures also showed The Quick and the Dead as an "out-of-competition" film at the May 1995 Cannes Film Festival. Additionally, Stone was nominated for the Saturn Award for Best Actress, but lost to Angela Bassett in Strange Days. A novelization written by Jack Curtis was published by HarperCollins in September 1995. The Region 1 DVD release came in September 1998.

Critical reception
The Quick and the Dead received mixed reviews from film critics. Based on 40 reviews, Rotten Tomatoes gives the film a score of 58%, with an average rating of 6.01/10. The site's consensus states "The Quick and the Dead isn't quite the draw that its intriguing premise and pedigree suggest, but fans of nontraditional Westerns should have some rootin' tootin' fun." Metacritic calculated an average score of 49/100, based on 21 reviews.

Janet Maslin of The New York Times praised Stone's performance and Raimi's directing. "Stone's presence nicely underscores the genre-bending tactics of Raimi, the cult filmmaker now doing his best to reinvent the B movie in a spirit of self-referential glee." Roger Ebert of the Chicago Sun-Times criticized the film for being overtly cliché, but praised Raimi's direction and Dante Spinotti's cinematography. Critic and Raimi biographer Bill Warren wrote that the film "is a very conscious (though not self-conscious) attempt to recreate some of the themes, style and appeal of Sergio Leone's majestically operatic Spaghetti Westerns of the 1960s, especially the Man with No Name trilogy that starred Clint Eastwood. It's brisker, more romantic and somehow more American than Leone's movies."

Jonathan Rosenbaum of the Chicago Reader observed that "Raimi tries to do a Sergio Leone, and though The Quick and the Dead is highly enjoyable in spots, it doesn't come across as very convincing, perhaps because nothing can turn Sharon Stone into Charles Bronson." Peter Travers of Rolling Stone felt that "The Quick and the Dead plays like a crazed compilation of highlights from famous westerns. Raimi finds the right look but misses the heartbeat. You leave the film dazed instead of dazzled, as if an expert marksman had drawn his gun only to shoot himself in the foot."

Critical reassessment
Although having a mixed critical reception upon release, The Quick and the Dead has received praise from both critics and fans alike. Tom Reimann of  Collider considers the film as one of Raimi's best movies: "The movie is so unabashedly bonkers that it’s impossible not to have a good time." Scott Hallam of Dread Central praised Raimi's directing and versatility in multiple genres of film and the cast. Jay Royston of WhatCulture.com praised the film and considered it one of Raimi's finest movies by saying, "...I have to put it in the top 3 Raimi movies, maybe because it is so unlike other Raimi films yet combines all three of the best qualities of a director already mentioned; working with actors, innovating camera shots and telling a good story visually." Bill Gibron of PopMatters said, "This was the geek breaking point for many a certified Raimaniac. First off, it was a Western in the days when the genre was more or less struggling for life. In addition, it starred a yet to be hot Leonardo DiCaprio, a question mark named Russell Crowe, and the sexually inert Sharon Stone. About the only thing it had going for it was Raimi's manic direction, and even that seemed...showy. Still, in retrospect, this is a good film, undermined by forces outside itself."

Richard Schertzer of MovieWeb considered the film as one of Raimi's best films: "With its energy, a subversive female lead from Stone, and its surprising violence, The Quick and the Dead makes for a strong entry in his repertoire as a filmmaker and a wondrous first time western for him." Patrick Philips from Looper also praised the movie and considered it a "cult classic": "Of all the films on Sam Raimi's delightfully left-of-center resume, this is the one that deserves to be rediscovered by the cinematic world — if only via midnight screenings." BJ Colangelo of /Film also praised the movie and considered it one of Raimi’s most underrated films: "There are enough dutch angle dolly zooms in this film to make someone feel disoriented, but it works. "The Quick and the Dead" has the heart of a classic Western, but revamped for modern audiences with snappier taste." Film critic Adrian Martin remarked, "Sam Raimi's The Quick and the Dead is a feminist Western starring a gun-toting Sharon Stone[. There's] a terrific scene where Lady goes berserk and challenges a guy who has just sexually abused the teenage daughter of the sad saloonkeeper. Raimi takes us straight from Stone’s split-second outburst of recognition to the sight of her racing forward in the pelting rain, both guns firing in righteous fury, screaming from the depths of her soul. Leone himself couldn’t have done that bit any better."

See also

 1995 in film

References

External links

 
 
 
 
 

1995 films
1995 Western (genre) films
1995 action thriller films
1990s American films
1990s English-language films
American Western (genre) films
American action thriller films
American films about revenge
Films about capital punishment
Films about death
Films about duels
Films directed by Sam Raimi
Films scored by Alan Silvestri
Films set in the 1880s
Films set in 1881
Films shot in Tucson, Arizona
Girls with guns films
Murder in films
TriStar Pictures films